The Turkmenistan Cup 2009 is 17th since independence of the Turkmen national football cup. The competition will start on August 9, 2009 and finish with the Final played on a date to be announced.

First round
The first round involved 16 teams. The matches were played on August 9 (first legs) and August 12, 2009 (second legs).

|}

Quarterfinals
The quarterfinal matches were played on August 19 (first legs) and August 22, 2009 (second legs).

|}

First leg

Second leg

Nebitçi Balkanabat won 7–1 on aggregate.

Merw Mary won 4–2 on aggregate.

Altyn Asyr won 7–2 on aggregate.

HTTU Aşgabat won 6–2 on aggregate.

Semifinals
The first legs were played on August 26 and second on August 29, 2009.

|}

First leg

Second leg

Merw Mary won 2–1 on aggregate.

FC Altyn Asyr won 3–3 on away goals.

Final

See also
 2009 Turkmenistan League

External links
 http://www.turkmenistan.gov.tm
 https://web.archive.org/web/20120703010749/http://zamantm.com/

Turkmenistan Cup
Turkmenistan Cup, 2009